Youyi Road Subdistrict is a subdistrict located on western Hexi District, Tianjin, China. It is located to the south of Yuexiu Road and Machang Subdistricts, west of Jianshan Subdistrict, north of Meijiang Subdistrict, and east of Tianta Subdistrict. According to the 2020 census, its had 77,883 people residing within its borders.

The subdistrict was formed in 1984, and incorporated Heixiucheng Subdistrict in 2000. It was named after Youyi Road that passes through it.

Geography 
Youyi Road Subdistrict was bounded by Weijin and Fuxing Rivers to the west and south respectively. Dongnan Banhuan Expressway runs east-west through the subdistrict.

Administrative divisions 
In the year 2021, 13 residential communities constituted Youyi Road Subdistrict. They are, by the order of their Administrative Division Codes:

Gallery

References 

Township-level divisions of Tianjin
Hexi District, Tianjin